Lelslie L. Westin (November 25, 1917 – June 7, 1985) was an American businessperson and politician.

Westin was born  in Saint Paul, Minnesota and graduated from Minnehaha Academy in Minneapolis, Minnesota. He graduated from University of Minnesota with a degree in history and was a social studies teacher for four years. Westin was involved with the life insurance business. Westin lived with his wife and family in Saint Paul, Minnesota. He served in the Minnesota Senate from 1955 to 1962. Westin died from a heart attack in Saint Paul, Minnesota.

References

1917 births
1985 deaths
Businesspeople from Saint Paul, Minnesota
Politicians from Saint Paul, Minnesota
Schoolteachers from Minnesota
Minnesota state senators